Astrothelium ultralucens is a species of corticolous (bark-dwelling) lichen in the family Trypetheliaceae. Found in Venezuela, it was formally described as a new species in 2016 by André Aptroot. Its ascospores are hyaline, spindle-shaped (fusiform) with three septa and dimensions of 105–130 by 35–42 µm. Astrothelium ultralucens contains lichexanthone, a lichen product that causes the pseudostromata and the thallus to fluoresce yellow when lit with a long-wavelength UV light, although the thallus only weakly.

References

ultralucens
Lichen species
Lichens described in 2016
Lichens of Venezuela
Taxa named by André Aptroot